Ice jelly may refer to:
 Aiyu jelly, a Taiwanese dessert
 Bingfen, a dessert in Southwest China